Otok can refer to:

 Bosnia and Herzegovina
 Otok, Ljubuški, a village in western Herzegovina
 Croatia
 Otok, Vukovar-Srijem County, a town in eastern Croatia
 Otok, Međimurje County, a village near Čakovec, northern Croatia
 Otok, Split-Dalmatia County, a village in southern Croatia
 Poland
 Otok, Pajęczno County, a village in Łódź Voivodeship, central Poland
 Otok, Poddębice County, a village in Łódź Voivodeship, central Poland
 Otok, Lower Silesian Voivodeship, a village in southwest Poland
 Otok, Pomeranian Voivodeship, a village in north Poland
 Otok, West Pomeranian Voivodeship, a village in northwest Poland
 Slovenia
 Otok, Cerknica, a village in Inner Carniola, Slovenia
 Otok, Metlika, a village in White Carniola, Slovenia